Ras-responsive element-binding protein 1 is a protein that in humans is encoded by the RREB1 gene.

Clinical significance 

Mutations in RREB1 are associated to type 2 diabetes associated end-stage kidney disease.

References

Further reading